FC Irtysh Omsk is a Russian football club based in Omsk, Russia. It plays in the third-tier FNL 2.

History
Their best result in the 1992 season was 2nd in the Eastern Group of the Russian First Division. It was relegated to the 3rd tier in 1995. It was promoted to 2nd tier in 1996, then relegated to 3rd in 1998. As East Zone champions, Irtysh Omsk was promoted to 2nd tier in 2009. Irtysh Omsk finished 19 out of 20 and relegated to 3rd tier.

On 15 May 2020, the 2019–20 PFL season was abandoned due to COVID-19 pandemic in Russia. As Irtysh was leading in their PFL zone at the time, they were promoted to the second-tier FNL for the 2020–21 season. The club was relegated back to PFL after one season.

The club was founded in 1946 and has been known as:
 Krylia Sovetov (Крылья Советов) in 1946–1947
 Team of the Factory Baranov (Команда Завода имени Баранова) in 1948
 Bolshevik (Большевик) in 1949
 Krasnaja Zvezda (Красная Звезда)(Red Star) in 1957
 Irtysh (Иртыш) in 1958
 Irtysh-1946 (Иртыш-1946) from 2006 to 2009

Current squad
As of 22 February 2023, according to the official Second League website

References

External links
 Official website 

Association football clubs established in 1946
Football clubs in Russia
Sport in Omsk
1946 establishments in Russia